1966 was the 67th season of County Championship cricket in England. It featured an entertaining Test series between England and West Indies in which the great West Indian all-rounder Gary Sobers was outstanding. In domestic cricket, Yorkshire, led by Brian Close, won the County Championship. Close became England's captain too.

Honours
 County Championship – Yorkshire
 Gillette Cup – Warwickshire
 Minor Counties Championship – Lincolnshire
 Second XI Championship – Surrey II 
 Wisden – Bob Barber, Basil D'Oliveira, Colin Milburn, John Murray, Seymour Nurse

Test series

West Indies won the series 3–1 with one match drawn.

County Championship

Gillette Cup

Leading batsmen
Gary Sobers topped the averages with 1,349 runs @ 61.31

Leading bowlers
Derek Underwood topped the averages with 157 wickets @ 13.80

References

Annual reviews
 Playfair Cricket Annual 1967
 Wisden Cricketers' Almanack 1967

External links
 CricketArchive – season summary

1966 in English cricket
English cricket seasons in the 20th century